Til sæters (To the Mountain Pastures) is a Norwegian silent comedy film from 1924 directed by Harry Ivarson (his first Norwegian film). He also wrote the screenplay based on Claus Pavels Riis's 1850 musical Til Sæters: dramatisk Idyl med Sange (To the Mountain Pastures: A Dramatic Idyll with Singing). The plot of the musical was very thin and mostly served as an excuse to link together various dance performances accompanied by well-known Norwegian folk melodies. Ivarson therefore added more people to the story and a little more intrigue, but retained the basic mood of the musical.

Til sæters is an example of the folk romantic film genre that was popular in Norway in the 1920s.

Filming
The filming took place in Øystre Slidre and at the Norwegian Museum of Cultural History at Bygdøy.

Plot
A widow on a large farm has two daughters she hopes to marry off. Ragnhild, one of the daughters, is intended to be married to the village schoolmaster, but she is in love with Asmund, a poor farm boy. Asmund gives Ragnhild a silver cross, which the schoolmaster steals, and in despair Ragnhild tries to avoid Asmund, who believes that Ragnhild is flirting with Halvor, a rich man's son. After many complications, the silver cross is returned to its rightful owner, the schoolmaster receives his punishment, and Ragnhild and Asmund are united. In addition, it turns out that Halvor likes the other daughter, Sigrid, and there is a double wedding.

Cast
 Ellen Sinding as Ragnhild 
 Hjalmar Fries as Asmund Nordheia 
 Olafr Havrevold as Halvor, son of a rich farmer 
 Didi Holtermann as Desideria, a servant girl 
 Sigrun Svenningsen as Sigrid 
 Signe Heide Steen as Gunhild 
 Sverre Næss as the schoolmaster 
 Rudolf Mjølstad as Per 
 Emmy Worm-Müller as Kari 
 Arne Svendsen as the priest 
 Idar Tranar as Nordal, a theology student  
 Henry Randolf as Stenby, a theology student 
 Josef Sjøgren as Busk, a perpetual student

References

External links

Til sæters at the National Library of Norway

1924 films
Norwegian films based on plays
Norwegian silent films
Films directed by Harry Ivarson
Norwegian black-and-white films
Norwegian comedy-drama films
1924 comedy-drama films
Silent comedy-drama films